The Jekyll Island Club was a private club on Jekyll Island, on Georgia's Atlantic coast. It was founded in 1886 when members of an incorporated hunting and recreational club purchased the island for $125,000 (about $3.1 million in 2017) from John Eugene du Bignon. The original design of the Jekyll Island Clubhouse, with its signature turret, was completed in January 1888.  The club thrived through the early 20th century; its members came from many of the world's wealthiest families, most notably the Morgans, Rockefellers, and Vanderbilts.  The club closed at the end of the 1942 season due to complications from World War II.

In 1947, after five years of funding a staff to keep up the lawn and cottages, the island was purchased from the club's remaining members for $675,000 (about $7.4 million in 2017) during condemnation proceedings by the state of Georgia. The state tried operating the club as a resort, but this was not financially successful, and the entire complex was closed by 1971.

The complex was designated a historic landmark in 1978.

It was restored and reopened as a luxury resort hotel in 1985. Jekyll Island Club Hotel is a member of Historic Hotels of America, the official program of the National Trust for Historic Preservation.

Founding

At the end of the plantation era of Jekyll Island, Newton Finney, suggested to Dubignon, his brother-in-law, that they might acquire the island and then sell it to Northern businessmen as a winter resort.  A New York banker helped with the purchase of the entire island.  By 1885, Dubignon was the sole owner of Jekyll.

In 1885, Finney and a New York associate, Oliver K. King, gathered a group of men and petitioned the Glynn county courts, becoming incorporated as the "Jekyl Island Club" on December 9, 1885.  They agreed to sell 100 shares of the Jekyll Island Club stock to 50 people at $600 a share (about $15,000 in 2017).

Finney had no difficulty selling the shares.  Six of the first seven shares went to the men who signed the charter petition: Finney, Dubignon, King, Richard L. Ogden, William B. D'Wolf, and Charles L. Schlatter.  In all, Finney was able to find 53 people to join the club, including such famous names as Henry Hyde, Marshall Field, John Pierpont Morgan, Joseph Pulitzer, and William K. Vanderbilt.

On February 17, 1886, Finney signed an official agreement with Dubignon, who sold Jekyll Island to Finney's Jekyll Island Club for $125,000. On April 1, 1886, a meeting was held in New York to create the constitution and by-laws, and to nominate officers for the club.  The first president was Lloyd Aspinwall, vice president was Judge Henry Elias Howland, treasurer was Franklin M. Ketchum, and Richard L. Ogden became secretary.  These men faced the difficult task of turning the undeveloped property into a social club for the wealthy upper class of America.

Lloyd Aspinwall served just 5 months as the club president before he died suddenly.  Henry Howland then took up the position as president of the club.

Committees were formed to get the club off the ground.  Charles A. Alexander of Chicago was chosen to design the clubhouse, and Horace William Shaler Cleveland, a famous landscape architect, was chosen to design and lay out the grounds.

Ground was broken on the clubhouse building in mid-August 1886. After some setbacks the clubhouse was completed on November 1.  The club officially opened its doors when the executive committee arrived for the 1888 season on January 21.

Several nationally important events took place on Jekyll Island during the Club era, including the first transcontinental telephone call made by Theodore N. Vail, president of AT&T, to Alexander Graham Bell, Thomas A. Watson and President Woodrow Wilson in 1915; and the development of the Aldrich–Vreeland Act for the National Monetary Commission in 1908.

Recreation during the club era
The Jekyll Island Club was a unique resort, more family-oriented than the Union Club or the Chicago Club.  It enjoyed great popularity among the elite classes, maintaining a highly exclusive character for 60 years.

When the club started out, hunting was a major recreational activity.  A gamekeeper was hired to keep the island well-stocked with pheasants, turkeys, quail and deer.

All members were to report daily what they had killed and turn it over to the club.  Wild game was a common sight on the menu of the clubhouse.  A taxidermist shop was located within the club compound, specifically for mounting the prize game.

As the club grew, other recreations became popular.  Golf eventually took over as the club's dominant sport.  The first course was located just to the north of the Club compound.  Later, in the 1920s, an ocean side course was built.  A portion of this historic golf course is still intact, and can be played.

Other leisure activities included carriage driving, tennis, and bicycling.

Role in the history of the Federal Reserve
Jekyll Island was the location of a meeting in November 1910 in which draft legislation was written to create a central banking system for the United States.  Following the Panic of 1907, banking reform became a major issue in the United States. Senator Nelson Aldrich (R-RI), chairman of the National Monetary Commission, went to Europe for almost two years to study that continent's banking systems.  Upon his return, he brought together many of the country's leading financiers to Jekyll Island to discuss monetary policy and the banking system, drafting legislation which was introduced in Congress as the "Aldrich Plan". Some ideas from the Aldrich Plan were later incorporated into the Federal Reserve Act.

On the evening of November 22, 1910, Sen. Aldrich and A.P. Andrews (Assistant Secretary of the United States Treasury Department), Paul Warburg (a naturalized German representing Kuhn, Loeb & Co.), Frank A. Vanderlip (president of the National City Bank of New York), Henry P. Davison (senior partner of J. P. Morgan Company), Charles D. Norton (president of the Morgan-dominated First National Bank of New York), and Benjamin Strong (representing J. P. Morgan), together representing about one quarter of the world's wealth at the time, left Hoboken, New Jersey on a train in complete secrecy, dropping their last names in favor of first names, or code names, so no one would discover who they all were. The excuse for such powerful representatives and wealth was to go on a duck hunting trip on Jekyll Island.

Forbes magazine founder Bertie Charles Forbes wrote several years later:

Picture a party of the nation's greatest bankers stealing out of New York on a private railroad car under cover of darkness, stealthily riding hundreds of miles South, embarking on a mysterious launch, sneaking onto an island deserted by all but a few servants, living there a full week under such rigid secrecy that the names of not one of them was once mentioned, lest the servants learn the identity and disclose to the world this strangest, most secret expedition in the history of American finance. I am not romancing; I am giving to the world, for the first time, the real story of how the famous Aldrich currency report, the foundation of our new currency system, was written ... The utmost secrecy was enjoined upon all. The public must not glean a hint of what was to be done. Senator Aldrich notified each one to go quietly into a private car of which the railroad had received orders to draw up on an unfrequented platform. Off the party set. New York's ubiquitous reporters had been foiled ... Nelson (Aldrich) had confided to Henry, Frank, Paul and Piatt that he was to keep them locked up at Jekyll Island, out of the rest of the world, until they had evolved and compiled a scientific currency system for the United States, the real birth of the present Federal Reserve System, the plan done on Jekyll Island in the conference with Paul, Frank and Henry ... Warburg is the link that binds the Aldrich system and the present system together. He more than any one man has made the system possible as a working reality.

Decline and closure of the club
The Great Depression in 1929 caused great changes on Jekyll Island.  This depression touched even the very wealthy across the country and membership in an exclusive club became an extravagance.  Membership dropped slowly through the 1930s as the depression continued.

With the financial situation of the club worsening, the executive committee decided to create a new level of club membership in 1933.  A more affordable level of membership, the Associate membership was designed to fit the needs, and pocketbook, of anyone.  It was an attempt to draw in new and younger people as well as to draw more members back to the clubhouse.  This new membership did revitalize the club membership roster, although only for a brief period.

World War II was the final blow to the life of the Jekyll Island Club.  The club opened as usual for the 1942 season.  However, by the beginning of March it was announced there would be an early close to the season due to the club's financial situation and the strain the war had on the labor situation.  The 1942 season would turn out to be the final season for the Jekyll Island Club.

There was hope by the president that the Club might be reopened after the war with renewed interest.  However, in 1946 the state of Georgia entered the picture.  The state's revenue commissioner, Melvin E. Thompson, wanted to purchase one of Georgia's barrier islands and open it to the public as a state park.  Finally, on June 2, 1947, the state purchased the island through a condemnation order for $675,000 (or approximately $5,563,416 in 2003 dollars).

The club was turned into a public resort by the state, but closed by 1971, a financial failure. It was made a historic landmark in 1978 and restored and reopened as the Radisson Jekyll Island Club Hotel in 1985. Radisson ceased managing the hotel some years later, and it currently operates as the Jekyll Island Club Resort.

List of members
During the club's inception, a limit of 100 members was imposed to ensure the club's exclusiveness.  During the financially difficult Great Depression period, the club began referring to its members as founders and created the new Associate Membership.  This membership was purchased at a lower price, but with all of the benefits that the founders enjoyed, and limited to a total of 150.

This list includes many of the most notable members and is not exhaustive.

Associate Members:
(This class of membership was adopted in 1933)

Presidents
 1886–1887 — Lloyd Aspinwall
 1887–1896 — Henry Howland
 1897–1914 — Charles Lanier
 1914–1919 — Frederick Bourne
 1919–1927 — Dr. Walter James
 1927–1933 — Walter Jennings
 1933–1938 — J.P. Morgan Jr.
 1938–1942 — Bernon Prentice

Jekyll Island Club Historic District
Jekyll Island Club Historic District is a National Register of Historic Places (NRHP) historic district and National Historic Landmark District in Glynn County, Georgia. Located on the west side of Jekyll Island, the 240-acre (97.1 hectares) district is roughly bordered by Riverview Drive to the west, and the long arc of Stable Road (Old Village Boulevard) to the north, east and south. It contains thirty-three contributing properties from the Jekyll Island Club, including the separately-NRHP-listed Rockefeller Cottage and Faith Chapel. Jekyll Island Club Historic District was added to the NRHP on January 20, 1972, and was designated a national historic landmark district on June 2, 1978.

From 1967 to 1968, Savannah landscape architect Clermont Huger Lee created a master development plan with the goal to restore the area known as “Millionaire’s Village” to its 1910-1929 era. Though not fully implemented, Lee's plans served as a foundation in the redevelopment of today's Jekyll Island Historic District.

Contributing properties

Non-contributing and demolished properties

See also
List of National Historic Landmarks in Georgia (U.S. state)
National Register of Historic Places listings in Glynn County, Georgia

References

External links
 The Jekyll Island Museum - The Jekyll Island Museum
 Jekyll Island Club Hotel - official website
 New York Times - 1994 article about the restored hotel
 Jekyll Island Club Wharf historical marker
 The Boat House Site historical marker
 

Buildings and structures completed in 1886
National Historic Landmarks in Georgia (U.S. state)
Historic districts on the National Register of Historic Places in Georgia (U.S. state)
Organizations based in Georgia (U.S. state)
1886 establishments in Georgia (U.S. state)
Buildings and structures in Glynn County, Georgia
Clubhouses in Georgia (U.S. state)
Clubhouses on the National Register of Historic Places in Georgia (U.S. state)
Organizations established in 1886
Gentlemen's clubs in the United States
Golf clubs and courses in Georgia (U.S. state)
Hotel buildings on the National Register of Historic Places in Georgia (U.S. state)
Hotels in Georgia (U.S. state)
National Register of Historic Places in Glynn County, Georgia
Jekyll Island
Historic Hotels of America